movmnt magazine was an urban-leaning lifestyle magazine which was co-founded in 2006 by David Benaym and Danny Tidwell. The magazine featured columns by Mario Spinetti, Mia Michaels, Robert Battle, Debbie Allen, Alisan Porter, Rasta Thomas, and Frank Conway.  Both Travis Wall and Ivan Koumaev were the guest contributors to the publication, which published photographs by Gary Land, Dave Hill, James Archibald Houston, and Alison Jackson. The magazine ceased publication in 2013.

References

 movmnt as described on magazine.org
 movmnt acknowledged in the Magazine Yellow Pages magazineyellowpages.com
 Article in Media Daily News mediadailynews.com
 Article in the New York Times, July 11, 2007, about Danny Tidwell and his involvement with movmnt New York Times
 New York Times article, September 21, 2007, quote David Benaym and Danny Tidwell as co-founders of movmnt magazine. New York Times

External links
 movmnt magazine official website www.movmnt.com

Fashion magazines published in the United States
Lifestyle magazines published in the United States
Music magazines published in the United States
Quarterly magazines published in the United States
Dance magazines
Defunct magazines published in the United States
Magazines established in 2006
Magazines disestablished in 2013
Magazines published in New York City